The 1990 Pacific typhoon season was another active season. It has no official bounds; it ran year-round in 1990, but most tropical cyclones tend to form in the northwestern Pacific Ocean between May and November. These dates conventionally delimit the period of each year when most tropical cyclones form in the northwestern Pacific Ocean.

The scope of this article is limited to the Pacific Ocean, north of the equator and west of the international date line. Storms that form east of the date line and north of the equator are called hurricanes; see 1990 Pacific hurricane season. Tropical Storms formed in the entire west Pacific basin were assigned a name by the Joint Typhoon Warning Center. Tropical depressions in this basin have the "W" suffix added to their number. Tropical depressions that enter or form in the Philippine area of responsibility are assigned a name by the Philippine Atmospheric, Geophysical and Astronomical Services Administration or PAGASA. This can often result in the same storm having two names.

Season summary

Systems 
41 tropical cyclones formed this year in the Western Pacific, of which 31 became tropical storms. 19 storms reached typhoon intensity, of which 4 reached super typhoon strength.

Severe Tropical Storm Koryn 

On January 12, both the JMA and the JTWC identified a tropical depression in the northwest Pacific Ocean. The depression intensified over the period of a day to become a tropical storm on January 13, when it received the name Koryn from the JTWC. According to them, but not the JMA, Koryn reached typhoon strength on January 15, when it peaked in intensity. The storm then weakened quite rapidly until it became extratropical on January 17, at 0000 UTC.

Tropical Storm Lewis 

Tropical Storm Lewis was a minimal tropical storm that only held said intensity for two days.

Typhoon Marian 

Marian was a typhoon over the South China Sea.

CMA Tropical Depression 04

CMA Tropical Depression 05

Tropical Depression 04W 

4W was short-lived.

Severe Tropical Storm Nathan (Akang) 

A tropical disturbance trekked across the Philippines in mid June, upon entering the South China Sea a depression formed. The depression was upgraded to Tropical Storm Nathan on June 16. Tropical Storm Nathan reached peak intensity of 65 mph (100 km/h) shortly before striking Hainan Island. In the South China Sea the Chinese ship Tien Fu sank killing 4 people. In southern China torrential rains caused flooding in Guangdong Province killing 10 people, two people drowned in Macau due to high waves. Tropical Storm Nathan then continued northwestwards making a final landfall near the Vietnam/China border.

Typhoon Ofelia (Bising) 

The monsoon trough spawned a tropical depression east of the Philippines on June 15. It tracked to the northwest then westward, slowly organizing into a tropical storm on June 18. Ofelia turned more to the northwest and became a typhoon on June 20. Paralleling the east coast of the Philippines, it reached a peak of 100 mph (155 km/h) winds before hitting Taiwan on June 23. Ofelia weakened over the country, and brushed eastern China before dissipating on June 25 near Korea. Ofelia caused heavy flooding throughout its track, resulting in at least 64 casualties.

Typhoon Percy (Klaring) 

Typhoon Percy, which developed on June 20, reached a peak of 135 mph winds while located a short distance east of the northern Philippines. Increasing vertical shear weakened Percy to a 95 mph typhoon before crossing extreme northern Luzon on the 27th, an area that felt the effects of Ofelia only days before. It remained a weak typhoon until hitting southeastern China on the 29th before dissipating on the 1st. Percy caused serious damage and flooding in the Carolina Islands and northern Philippines, amounting to 9 deaths.

Tropical Storm Robyn (Deling) 

The outskirts of the storm brought  of rainfall to Vladivostok in the Russian Far East.

CMA Tropical Depression 11 

CMA 11 was an short lived system which hit Vietnam, bringing heavy rains, overall minimal damage.

Severe Tropical Storm Tasha (Emang) 

65 mph Tropical Storm Tasha, which developed on July 22 and meandered through the South China Sea, hit southern China on the 30th, 75 miles east of Hong Kong. The storm caused torrential flooding in southern China, causing widespread damage and 108 fatalities.

Typhoon Steve 

Steve recurved out at sea.

Typhoon Vernon 

Vernon followed Steve's footsteps.

Severe Tropical Storm Winona 

The origins of Winona can be traced back to Severe Tropical Storm Tasha.
On August 2, the remnant low of Tasha, as a patch of thunderstorms over northeastern China, was pushed to the east by a weather front from the west. By August 4, Tasha entered the Yellow Sea, before being pushed south by an anticyclone off northeastern Korea, into the East China Sea.
Although the same system, Tasha was named Winona, as it started to strengthen into a tropical storm by August 7. It reached peak intensity with an eye-like feature on August 8, before landfalling over Japan the next day. Later, the remnants became extratropical.

Typhoon Yancy (Gading) 

Typhoon Yancy killed 12 people in the Philippines after a landslide destroyed a dormitory. In China, severe damage occurred and at least 216 people were killed. 20 people were killed in Taiwan.

Tropical Storm Aka 

Aka was a weak tropical storm. It originated from the Central Pacific hurricane basin and drifted west into the Northwestern Pacific basin on August 13th.

Typhoon Zola 

On August 15, a large area of convection associated with the inflow of developing Typhoon Yancy was cut off, as Yancy was moving too fast to the west for the convection in the east to be absorbed into Yancy. By August 16, the convection developed a mid to low level circulation, and developed into tropical storm by August 18. Zola intensified into a typhoon by the next day, before reaching peak intensity on August 21. By the next day, Zola made landfall over Japan, before dissipating north of Japan.
High winds and heavy rains produced by the storm killed three people and injured 22 others in Japan.

Typhoon Abe (Iliang) 

Forming on August 23 from a tropical disturbance, the depression which would eventually develop into Typhoon Abe initially tracked in a steady west-northwestward direction. As a result of an intense monsoon surge, the system's trajectory briefly changed to an eastward then northward path before returning to its original track. Abe only intensified by a small amount between 0000 UTC August 24 and 0600 UTC August 27 due to the disruptive effects of the surge, and on August 30, Abe peaked in intensity as a Category 2-equivalent typhoon on the Saffir–Simpson hurricane wind scale. After peaking in intensity, Abe crossed the Ryukyu Islands and the East China Sea, making landfall in China where it affected the provinces of Zhejiang and Jiangsu before entering the Yellow Sea, crossing South Korea, and finally transitioning into an extratropical cyclone.

Typhoon Abe killed 108–195 people after it caused flooding and landslides in the Philippines and Taiwan, ravaged coastal areas of China, and brought high waves to Japan. Abe, which is responsible for killing 108 in China, affected half of Zhejiang's land area and a fourth of its population, leaving thousands homeless and causing ¥3.5 billion yuan (RMB, $741.5–743 million USD) to be lost in damages. Additional damage and one fatality occurred in Okinawa Prefecture in Japan, where at least ¥890 million yen (JPY, US$6 million) in damage was caused.

Typhoon Becky (Heling) 

Tropical Storm Becky, having developed on August 20, hit northern Luzon on the 26th as a strong tropical storm. It strengthened over the South China Sea to an 80 mph typhoon, and hit northern Vietnam at that intensity on the 29th. Becky was responsible for killing 32 people and causing heavy flooding.

Tropical Storm Cecil 

Cecil hit China.

Typhoon Dot (Loleng) 

Typhoon Dot formed from a monsoon trough to the southwest of Guam. Dot moved steadily towards the northwest and strengthened into a typhoon. Typhoon Dot reached peak intensity of 85 mph before weakening slight before landfall on eastern Taiwan on the 7th of September. After passing Taiwan Dot regained typhoon intensity in the Formosa Strait before making a final landfall in Fujian Province, China. On northern Luzon Island rains from Typhoon Dot caused floods killing 4 people, on Taiwan 3 people died.

Typhoon Ed (Miding) 

Severe flooding produced by the storm killed at least 18 people in Vietnam. At least 4,500 homes were destroyed and another 140,000 were inundated.

Typhoon Flo (Norming) 

Typhoon Flo, which developed on September 12, rapidly intensified on the 16th and 17th to a 165 mph super typhoon near Okinawa. Vertical shear weakened it as it recurved to the northeast, and Flo hit Honshū, Japan on the 19th as a 100 mph typhoon. It continued rapidly northeastward, became extratropical on the 20th, and dissipated on the 22nd. Widespread flooding and landslides killed 32 and caused millions in damage.

Typhoon Gene (Oyang) 

A tropical disturbance consolidated into a tropical depression on the 23rd of September to the east of the Philippines. Tropical Storm Gene was named as the storm moved towards the northwest and strengthened into a typhoon the next day. Typhoon Gene reached peak intensity of 95 mph on the 27th shortly before recurving towards the northeast. Gene then skimmed the coasts of Kyūshū, Shikoku and Honshū Islands in Japan before moving out to sea and turning extratropical. Winds on 85 mph were recorded on Kyūshū and heavy rains fell across the region, resulting floods and landslides killed 4 people.

Typhoon Hattie (Pasing) 

Typhoon Hattie formed as Typhoon Gene was accelerating towards Japan. Hattie strengthened into a typhoon on the 3rd of October while moving towards the northwest and reached a peak intensity of 105 mph the next day. Typhoon Hattie began to recurve while west of the island of Okinawa. Heavy rains from Typhoons Flo, Gene and Hattie broke the drought that plagued the island. As Hattie accelerated towards Japan it was downgraded to a tropical storm before brushing pass Kyūshū and Shikoku before making landfall on Honshū Island. Heavy rains caused a landslide on Shikoku Island killing three people when a landslide hit a bus.

Tropical Storm Ira 

Severe flooding in Thailand triggered by heavy rains from Ira killed at least 24 people.

Tropical Storm Jeana 

Jeana hit southeast Asia.

Typhoon Kyle 

A category 2 typhoon which did not impact land directly. It formed on October 14 and was classified as a Tropical Depression. It became a tropical storm and a typhoon later. Kyle reached a peak intensity of a Category 2 typhoon on September 20. Then, the storm turned eastward instead of affecting Japan. It stated to weaken and was classified as a tropical storm and eventually dissipated on the 22nd. Kyle did not kill anyone or cause any damage.

Tropical Storm Lola 

Extreme rainfall, peaking near  triggered extensive flooding that left some regions under  of water. At least 16 people were killed by the storm.

Typhoon Mike (Ruping) 

Super Typhoon Mike was the deadliest typhoon of the season. It struck the central Philippines in mid-November, where landslides, flooding, and extreme wind damage to caused over 748 casualties and over $1.94 billion in damage (1990 USD). The name Mike was retired after this season and replaced with Manny.

Severe Tropical Storm Nell 

Nell also hit southeast Asia.

Tropical Depression Susang

Typhoon Owen (Uding) 

As Super Typhoon Owen crossed the Marshall Islands and Caroline Islands in mid to late November, it caused extreme damage to the many islands. Some islands lost 95%-99% of the dwellings, as well as 80-90% crops being destroyed. Through all of the damage, Owen only killed 2 people.

Typhoon Page (Tering) 

Super Typhoon Page formed on November 21 as a tropical depression. From there, it tracked slowly westward, making a cyclonic loop. Page continued westward, and strengthened into a Category 5 typhoon. It then accelerated northeastward, making landfall in Japan on November 30 as a Category 1 typhoon. Page dissipated over northeast Japan on December 3.

Typhoon Russ 

The final storm of the season, Russ, formed on December 13. The typhoon brought heavy damage to Guam when it passed near the island on December 20. Damage estimates ranged as high as $120 million (1990 USD), but nobody perished in the storm.

Storm names 

During the season 30 named tropical cyclones developed in the Western Pacific and were named by the Joint Typhoon Warning Center, when it was determined that they had become tropical storms. These names were contributed to a revised list which started on mid-1989.

Philippines 

The Philippine Atmospheric, Geophysical and Astronomical Services Administration uses its own naming scheme for tropical cyclones in their area of responsibility. PAGASA assigns names to tropical depressions that form within their area of responsibility and any tropical cyclone that might move into their area of responsibility. Should the list of names for a given year prove to be insufficient, names are taken from an auxiliary list, the first 10 of which are published each year before the season starts. Names not retired from this list will be used again in the 1994 season. This is the same list used for the 1986 season. PAGASA uses its own naming scheme that starts in the Filipino alphabet, with names of Filipino female names ending with "ng" (A, B, K, D, etc.).

Retirement 
Due to the severity of damage and loss of life caused by Mike, the name was retired and was replaced with Manny and was first used in the 1993 season. PAGASA also retired the name Ruping for similar reasons and was replaced with Ritang for the 1994 season.

Season effects 
This table summarizes all the systems that developed within or moved into the North Pacific Ocean, to the west of the International Date Line during 1990. The tables also provide an overview of a systems intensity, duration, land areas affected and any deaths or damages associated with the system.

|-
| Koryn ||  || bgcolor=#| || bgcolor=#| || bgcolor=#| || Caroline Islands, Mariana Islands || None || None ||
|-
| Lewis ||  || bgcolor=#| || bgcolor=#| || bgcolor=#| || Caroline Islands ||  None || None ||
|-
| Marian ||  || bgcolor=#| || bgcolor=#| || bgcolor=#| || Philippines, Taiwan || None || None ||
|-
| TD ||  || bgcolor=#| || bgcolor=#| || bgcolor=#| || Philippines || None || None ||
|-
| TD ||  || bgcolor=#| || bgcolor=#| || bgcolor=#| || South China || None || None ||
|-
| TD ||  || bgcolor=#| || bgcolor=#| || bgcolor=#| || None || None || None ||
|-
| 04W ||  || bgcolor=#| || bgcolor=#| || bgcolor=#| || None || None || None ||
|-
| Nathan (Akang) ||  || bgcolor=#| || bgcolor=#| || bgcolor=#| || Philippines, South China, Vietnam || None ||  ||
|-
| Ofelia (Bising) ||  || bgcolor=#| || bgcolor=#| || bgcolor=#| || Philippines, Taiwan, East China, Korean Peninsula || None ||  ||
|-
| Percy (Klaring) ||  || bgcolor=#| || bgcolor=#| || bgcolor=#| || Caroline Islands, Philippines, China, Taiwan || None ||  ||
|-
| TD ||  || bgcolor=#| || bgcolor=#| || bgcolor=#| || Philippines || None || None ||
|-
| Robyn (Deling) ||  || bgcolor=#| || bgcolor=#| || bgcolor=#| || Philippines, Taiwan, Ryukyu Islands, South Korea ||  None || None ||
|-
| TD ||  || bgcolor=#| || bgcolor=#| || bgcolor=#| || None || None || None ||
|-
| TD ||  || bgcolor=#| || bgcolor=#| || bgcolor=#| || Vietnam || Minimal || None ||
|-
| Tasha (Emang) ||  || bgcolor=#| || bgcolor=#| || bgcolor=#| || Philippines, South China, Vietnam || None ||  ||
|-
| Steve ||  || bgcolor=#| || bgcolor=#| || bgcolor=#| || Mariana Islands || None || None ||
|-
| Vernon ||  || bgcolor=#| || bgcolor=#| || bgcolor=#| || None || None || None ||
|-
| Winona ||  || bgcolor=#| || bgcolor=#| || bgcolor=#| || Japan || None || Unknown ||
|-
| Yancy (Gading) ||  || bgcolor=#| || bgcolor=#| || bgcolor=#| || Caroline Islands, Mariana Islands, Taiwan, China || None ||  ||
|-
| Aka ||  || bgcolor=#| || bgcolor=#| || bgcolor=#| || Marshall Islands ||  None || None ||
|-
| Zola ||  || bgcolor=#| || bgcolor=#| || bgcolor=#| || Mariana Islands, Japan || None ||  ||
|-
| Abe (Iliang) ||  || bgcolor=#| || bgcolor=#| || bgcolor=#| || Caroline Islands, Mariana Islands, Ryukyu Islands, Taiwan, East China, Korean Peninsula ||  ||  ||
|-
| Becky (Heling) ||  || bgcolor=#| || bgcolor=#| || bgcolor=#| || Philippines, South China, Vietnam, Laos, Thailand, Burma || None ||  ||
|-
| Cecil ||  || bgcolor=#| || bgcolor=#| || bgcolor=#| || Taiwan, East China ||  None || None ||
|-
| Dot (Loleng) ||  || bgcolor=#| || bgcolor=#| || bgcolor=#| || Mariana Islands, Philippines, China, Taiwan || None ||  ||
|-
| Ed (Miding) ||  || bgcolor=#| || bgcolor=#| || bgcolor=#| || Mariana Islands, Philippines, Vietnam, South China || None ||  ||
|-
| Flo (Norming) ||  || bgcolor=#| || bgcolor=#| || bgcolor=#| || Caroline Islands, Mariana Islands, Japan ||  ||  ||
|-
| TD ||  || bgcolor=#| || bgcolor=#| || bgcolor=#| || Philippines || None || None ||
|-
| Gene (Oyang) ||  || bgcolor=#| || bgcolor=#| || bgcolor=#| || Japan || None ||  ||
|-
| Hattie (Pasing) ||  || bgcolor=#| || bgcolor=#| || bgcolor=#| || Japan || None ||  ||
|-
| Ira ||  || bgcolor=#| || bgcolor=#| || bgcolor=#| || Vietnam, Cambodia, Thailand, Myanmar ||  None ||  ||
|-
| Jeana ||  || bgcolor=#| || bgcolor=#| || bgcolor=#| || Vietnam, Cambodia ||  None || None ||
|-
| Kyle ||  || bgcolor=#| || bgcolor=#| || bgcolor=#| || Mariana Islands || None || None ||
|-
| Lola ||  || bgcolor=#| || bgcolor=#| || bgcolor=#| || Vietnam, Cambodia, Thailand, Myanmar ||  None ||  ||
|-
| Mike (Ruping) ||  || bgcolor=#| || bgcolor=#| || bgcolor=#| || Caroline Islands, Philippines, Vietnam, South China ||  ||  ||
|-
| Nell ||  || bgcolor=#| || bgcolor=#| || bgcolor=#| || Vietnam, Cambodia, Thailand || None || Unknown ||
|-
| Susang ||  || bgcolor=#| || bgcolor=#| || bgcolor=#| || Philippines || None || None ||
|-
| TD ||  || bgcolor=#| || bgcolor=#| || bgcolor=#| || Caroline Islands || None || None ||
|-
| Owen (Uding) ||  || bgcolor=#| || bgcolor=#| || bgcolor=#| || Marshall Islands, Caroline Islands || None ||  ||
|-
| Page (Tering) ||  || bgcolor=#| || bgcolor=#| || bgcolor=#| || Caroline Islands, Philippines, Japan || None || None ||
|-
| Russ ||  || bgcolor=#| || bgcolor=#| || bgcolor=#| || Marshall Islands, Mariana Islands, Caroline Islands ||  || None ||
|-

See also 

 1990 Pacific hurricane season
 1990 Atlantic hurricane season
 1990 North Indian Ocean cyclone season
 South-West Indian Ocean cyclone season: 1989–90, 1990–91
 Australian region cyclone season: 1989–90, 1990–91
 South Pacific cyclone season: 1989–90, 1990–91

References

External links 
 Satellite movie of 1990 Pacific typhoon season
 Japan Meteorological Agency
 Joint Typhoon Warning Center .
 China Meteorological Agency
 National Weather Service Guam
 Hong Kong Observatory
 Macau Meteorological Geophysical Services
 Korea Meteorological Agency
 Philippine Atmospheric, Geophysical and Astronomical Services Administration
 Taiwan Central Weather Bureau